The following elections occurred in the year 1881.

Africa
 1881 Liberian general election

Europe
 1881 French legislative election
 1881 German federal election
 1881 Portuguese legislative election
 1881 Spanish general election

North America

Canada
 1881 Quebec general election

United States
 1881 New York state election
 United States Senate election in New York, 1881
 United States Senate special elections in New York, 1881

Oceania
 1881 New Zealand general election

South America
 1881 Chilean presidential election

See also
 :Category:1881 elections

1881
Elections